The Battery is a landmark defensive seawall and promenade in Charleston, South Carolina. Named for a civil-war coastal defense artillery battery at the site, it stretches along the lower shores of the Charleston peninsula, bordered by the Ashley and Cooper Rivers, which meet here to form Charleston harbor.

Location
Historically, it has been understood to extend from the beginning of the seawall at the site of the former Omar Shrine Temple (40-44 East Bay Street) to the intersection of what is now Murray Boulevard and King Street. The higher part of the promenade, paralleling East Battery, as the street is known south of Water Street, to the intersection of Murray Boulevard, is known as High Battery. Fort Sumter is visible from the Cooper River side (High Battery) and from the point, as are Castle Pinckney, the World War II aircraft carrier USS Yorktown (CV-10), Fort Moultrie, and Sullivan's Island.

In popular speech and in a number of unofficial guidebooks and Web sites, The Battery and White Point Garden are sometimes referred to as "Battery Park," but the park and seawall promenade are not regarded by the City of Charleston as a single entity, and the term "Battery Park" is not an official designation.

History
Fort Broughton (ca. 1735) and Fort Wilkins (during the American Revolution and War of 1812) occupied White or Oyster Point, so named because of the piles of bleached oyster shells on the point at the tip of the peninsula. In the 18th century, rocks and heavy materials were used to fortify the shore of the Cooper River on the eastern side of the peninsula. In 1838, this area along the seawall became a promenade. First used as a public park in 1837, the area now known as White Point Garden became a place for artillery during the American Civil War.

Colleton Bastion was located near the intersection of Water and Meeting Streets.  During the Siege of Charleston, the British had to contend with Fort Johnson, Broughton's Battery, Dorrell's Fort, Wilkins' Fort, and Gibbs' Fort (at the foot of King Street).  During the Quasi-War Fort Mechanic (ca. 1795) stood where the current Edmondston-Alston House is now located. During the Civil War, Battery Ramsay occupied White Point Garden.

Architecture
As a tourist destination, the Battery is famous for its stately, mainly antebellum homes. Included among the grand houses are the Louis DeSaussure House (1 East Battery), the Roper House (9 East Battery), the William Ravenel House (13 East Battery), the Edmondston-Alston House (21 East Battery), the Charles Drayton House (25 East Battery), the George Chisolm House (39 East Battery), the Villa Margherita (4 South Battery), the William Washington House (8 South Battery), the Col. John A.S. Ashe House (26 South Battery), the James Spear House (30 South Battery), and the Col. John Ashe House (32 South Battery).

The Battery today

In 2004, a structural report by the City of Charleston showed that the Battery was suffering serious problems and could fail to protect the southeastern portion of the city during hurricanes. In 2012, the City announced that a $3.2 million restoration project would soon commence at the juncture of High Battery (along East Battery) and Low Battery (along Murray Blvd.).

See also

 Charleston Battery, a professional men's soccer team in the Charleston area.

References

Parks in Charleston, South Carolina
South Carolina in the American Civil War
Battery